The traditional Chinese lunisolar calendar divides a year into 24 solar terms. Dàxuě is the 21st solar term. It begins when the Sun reaches the celestial longitude of 255° and ends when it reaches the longitude of 270°. It more often refers in particular to the day when the Sun is exactly at the celestial longitude of 255°. In the Gregorian calendar, it usually begins around 7 December and ends around 21 December (22 December East Asia time).

Pentads

鶡旦不鳴, 'The jie-bird ceases to crow': the jie is a bird, similar to the pheasant, which is believed to be aggressive and combatant. As winter progresses, even this active bird slows and ceases to crow.
虎始交, 'Tigers begin to mate'
荔挺生, 'The litchi plant (tree) starts to germinate.'

Date and time

References

21
Winter time